José Isidro Moreno Árcega (born 19 February 1972) is a Mexican politician and lawyer affiliated with the PRI. He served as Deputy of the LXII Legislature of the Mexican Congress representing the State of Mexico, and previously served in the Congress of the State of Mexico.

References

1972 births
Living people
People from Mexico City
20th-century Mexican lawyers
Members of the Chamber of Deputies (Mexico)
Institutional Revolutionary Party politicians
21st-century Mexican politicians
Deputies of the LXII Legislature of Mexico
Members of the Congress of the State of Mexico
National Autonomous University of Mexico alumni